The Making of the Wizard Of Oz, written by film historian Aljean Harmetz, is a book about the production of the 1939 film The Wizard of Oz. It was the second book published documenting the making of this film, released a year after Doug McClelland's 1976 work Down the Yellow Brick Road.

The book was published in November 1977, after the film had been telecast a total of nineteen times. With 93 photos, the book tells readers how the film was made and describes the Golden Era of moviemaking in the 1930s and 1940s at Metro-Goldwyn-Mayer.

The book took two years to be created. Aljean Harmetz researched the film and the studio and interviewed the surviving cast, crew and MGM staff. From the acquisition of the music to the scripts, casting, and filming, Harmetz's book provides readers with a detailed re-creation of how the studio produced this film.

It was reissued in paperback in 1984, and again with a new preface by the author for the film's 50th anniversary in 1989. Another reissue was released, again with a new preface, shortly before the film's theatrical re-release in 1998, and another reissue is planned for the film's 75th anniversary in 2013.

After the success of the book, Aljean Harmetz adapted her knowledge and contacts with the film's survivors into a 30-minute PBS documentary in 1979.

Content 
 The Studio 1938
 The Scripts
 The Brains
 The Heart
 The Nerve and the Music
 Casting
 The directors
 The Stars and the Stand-ins
 The Munchkins
 "Below the line"
 Special Effects
 Accidents 
 After Oz

1977 non-fiction books
1989 non-fiction books
1998 non-fiction books
Books about individual films
The Wizard of Oz (1939 film)
Oz studies